Take Her, She's Mine is a 1963 American comedy film starring James Stewart and Sandra Dee based on the 1961 Broadway comedy written by Henry Ephron and Phoebe Ephron. The film was directed by Henry Koster with a screenplay by Nunnally Johnson. It features an early film score by prolific composer Jerry Goldsmith. The character of Mollie, played by Elizabeth Ashley on Broadway and in the film by Dee, was based on the screenwriters' 22-year-old daughter Nora Ephron. The supporting cast features Robert Morley, John McGiver and Bob Denver.

Plot
A Los Angeles attorney is overprotective toward his teenage daughter as she leaves home for college and to study art in Paris. Concerned over the letters that she has written describing her beatnik friends and activist beliefs, he travels to Paris to investigate her living situation.

Cast
 James Stewart as Frank Michaelson
 Sandra Dee as Mollie Michaelson
 Audrey Meadows as Anne Michaelson
 Robert Morley as Mr. Pope-Jones
 John McGiver as Hector G. Ivor
 Bob Denver as coffeehouse singer
 Philippe Forquet as Henri Bonnet
 Monica Moran as Linda Lehman
 Cynthia Pepper as Adele
 Jenny Maxwell as Sarah
 Charla Doherty as Liz Michaelson
 Maurice Marsac as M. Bonnet
 Marcel Hillaire as Policeman
 Irene Tsu as Miss Wu
 Charles Robinson as Stanley

Development
The film was based on a popular play with Art Carney. It was written by Henry and Phoebe Ephron based on Phoebe's correspondence with their daughter Nora, who was away at college. They wrote the script in six weeks and sent it to their agent. Both Josh Logan and Hal Prince wanted to produce the film, but the Ephrons decided on Prince as Logan had wanted big stars.

Production
The film rights were bought by 20th Century-Fox, which hired Nunnally Johnson to write the script. Johnson submitted a draft, but new studio head Darryl F. Zanuck demanded a rewrite with the last act set in Paris to lend the film more international appeal. Johnson later called the ending "a very lousy third act, all taken on the back lot and the French didn't understand that any more than the Americans either, by that time. But he (Zanuck) insisted on it."

The film was released on November 13, 1963, just nine days before the assassination of John F. Kennedy; in fact, a radio spot for the film aired on KLIF in Dallas just a few minutes after their first bulletin of the shooting. Quickly, 20th Century-Fox recalled all 350 copies of the film in order to delete a scene in which a character supposedly speaks with Jacqueline Kennedy.

Reception
According to Fox records, the film needed to earn $6,100,000 in film rentals to break even and made $5 million, resulting in a loss.

References

Bibliography

External links
 
 
 
 
 

1963 films
1963 comedy films
20th Century Fox films
CinemaScope films
American comedy films
American coming-of-age films
1960s English-language films
Films scored by Jerry Goldsmith
American films based on plays
Films directed by Henry Koster
Films set in Paris
Films with screenplays by Nunnally Johnson
1960s American films